Crest High School is a fully accredited public high school located in Colony, Kansas, United States, serving students in grades 9-12.  The school colors are red and blue and the school mascot is the Lancer. Crest High serves approximately 100 students per year. The athletic teams at Crest High compete in the 1A division according to the Kansas State High School Activities Association.

Extracurricular activities

Athletics
The extracurricular activities offered at Crest High School are small and limited due to the school's small size. The athletic teams offered are referred to as the Lancers and they compete in the 1A division according to the Kansas State High School Activities Association.

Crest High School offers the following sports:

Fall
 Football
 Volleyball
 Cheerleading

Winter
 Boys Basketball
 Girls Basketball
 Winter Cheerleading

Spring
 Boys Track and Field
 Girls Track and Field
 Baseball
 Softball

See also
 List of high schools in Kansas
 List of unified school districts in Kansas

References

External links

Official school website
 USD 479 School District Boundary Map, KDOT
 Colony City Map, KDOT

Public high schools in Kansas
Schools in Anderson County, Kansas